KWHQ-FM (100.1 FM, "Q-100 The Point") is a commercial country music radio station in Kenai, Alaska.

References

External links
Q-100 KWHQ-FM official website

WHQ-FM
Country radio stations in the United States
Radio stations established in 1982
1982 establishments in Alaska